Otto Geisert (18 November 1939 – 8 January 2021) was a German footballer who played as a midfielder. He spent seven seasons in the Bundesliga with Karlsruher SC and 1. FC Kaiserslautern. The best league finish he achieved was a fifth place.

He died on 8 January 2021, aged 81, in Kaiserslautern.

References

External links
 

1939 births
2021 deaths
German footballers
Association football midfielders
Bundesliga players
Eintracht Nordhorn players
Karlsruher SC players
1. FC Kaiserslautern players
R. Charleroi S.C. players
FC 08 Homburg players
German expatriate footballers
German expatriate sportspeople in Belgium
Expatriate footballers in Belgium
People from Nordhorn
Footballers from Lower Saxony